Frank Anderson McNeill (1 October 1877 – 21 October 1930) was a New Zealand cricketer. He played two first-class matches for Auckland in 1905/06.

See also
 List of Auckland representative cricketers

References

External links
 

1877 births
1930 deaths
Auckland cricketers
Cricketers from Dunedin
New Zealand cricketers